Porcellanopagurus is a genus of hermit crabs, containing the following species:
Porcellanopagurus adelocercus McLaughlin & Hogarth, 1998
Porcellanopagurus belauensis Suzuki & Takeda, 1987
Porcellanopagurus chiltoni de Saint Laurent & McLaughlin, 2000
Porcellanopagurus edwardsi Filhol, 1885
Porcellanopagurus filholi de Saint Laurent & McLaughlin, 2000
Porcellanopagurus foresti Zarenkov, 1990
Porcellanopagurus haptodactylus McLaughlin, 2000
Porcellanopagurus jacquesi McLaughlin, 1997
Porcellanopagurus japonicus Balss, 1913
Porcellanopagurus nihonkaiensis Takeda, 1985
Porcellanopagurus platei Lenz, 1902
Porcellanopagurus tridentatus Whitelegge, 1900
Porcellanopagurus truncatifrons Takeda, 1981

Porcellanopagurus is unusual among hermit crabs in that the body is largely symmetrical, with the abdomen held recurved above the cephalothorax. L. A. Borradaile interpreted Porcellanopagurus as being an independent instance of carcinisation among the Anomura.

References

Further reading

Hermit crabs
Taxa named by Henri Filhol